The 2011–12 Nemzeti Bajnokság I was the sixty-first edition of the top level championship in the Hungarian team handball for women. The regular season began on 4 September 2011 and concluded on 31 March 2011, followed by the classification rounds and the playoff finals.

Defending champions Győri Audi ETO KC won the regular season with a perfect performance and easily absolved their semi-finals matches as well, and marched into the finals where they met FTC-Rail Cargo Hungaria, which overcame Siófok KC-Galerius Fürdő with a double victory. In the closest final of the recent years, ETO eventually managed to retain their league title: they won the first leg of the finals to 37–33, coming back from 6 goals behind, while in the second leg the teams went head to head till the dying minutes, when by a one-goal ETO lead, with no time left on the clock, Ferencváros was awarded a penalty. Jelena Živković stepped to the 7 meters line with the chance to equalize the match and save it for penalty shootouts. However, retiring goalkeeper Katalin Pálinger, who played her last match in Győr saved the penalty shot and ETO celebrated their fifth championship in a row and ninth overall.

Overview

Teams
A total of twelve teams will compete in the league, including eleven clubs that participated in the past season's championship, joined by freshly promoted Kiskunhalas NKSE. Although officially bottom two teams get relegated and replaced by the Eastern and Western group winners of the second division, Mohácsi TE expressed that they have no desire to advance to the top division mostly for financial reasons. Therefore, following the decision of the Hungarian Handball Federation, eleventh placed UKSE Szekszárd could maintain its Nemzeti Bajnokság I membership. Twelfth placed Újbuda TC could not avoid relegation, after recorded only one victory during the whole season. Newcomers Kiskunhalas debuted in the Nemzeti Bajnokság I in 2004 and achieved their best result during the 2005–2006 season, when they finished sixth. In 2010 they suffered a level drop, but climbed back to the Nemzeti Bajnokság I immediately.

League winners Győri Audi ETO KC also entered the EHF Champions League in the group phase, while runners-up DVSC-Fórum began their European adventure in the qualifying stage of the competition. 2011 bronze medalists FTC-Rail Cargo Hungaria entered the EHF Cup Winners' Cup as title holders, having defeated CB Mar Alicante in the previous year's finals to 57–52. Since both 2010–2011 Hungarian cup finalists qualified for the EHF Champions League via their league position, the spot reserved for the Magyar Kupa winners was passed to cup third Alcoa FKC RightPhone, which joined Ferencvárosi TC in the EHF Cup Winners' Cup. Fourth placed Váci NKSE, that reached the quarterfinals of the EHF Cup in the past season, had the chance to repeat their good run, while Budapest Bank-Békéscsabai ENKSE, which made an early exit in the 2010–11 EHF Cup, got the opportunity to improve their European balance this time.

Sponsorship changes
Previous season's semifinalist Vác announced yet during the summer break, that they have split with their main sponsor SYMA, which could not guarantee the financial background they did earlier and eventually stepped down. As a result, the team have lost some of their key players and entered the season with a number of youngsters promoted from the second team, competing under their old name Váci NKSE. Meanwhile, DVSC agreed on a deal with the local mall center Fórum Debrecen, which became the club's new main sponsor, altering its name to DVSC-Fórum. In addition, on the same day they have signed a media contract with regional television Alföld TV, and under the terms of the agreement all of their matches will be live broadcast by the television station.

Arenas and locations

Regular season

Results

League table

Individual statistics

Top scorers

Worst disciplines

Team statistics

Overall
 Most wins – Győri Audi ETO KC (22)
 Fewest wins – UKSE Szekszárd (2)
 Most losses – UKSE Szekszárd and Kiskunhalas NKSE (17)
 Fewest losses – Győri Audi ETO KC (0)
 Most goals scored – Győri Audi ETO KC (888)
 Fewest goals scored – UKSE Szekszárd (574)
 Most goals conceded – Dunaújvárosi NKS (732)
 Fewest goals conceded - Győri Audi ETO KC (530)
 Best goal difference – Győri Audi ETO KC (+358)
 Worst goal difference – UKSE Szekszárd (–137)

Home
 Most wins – Győri Audi ETO KC (11)
 Fewest wins – UKSE Szekszárd (1)
 Most losses – Kiskunhalas NKSE (9)
 Fewest losses – Győri Audi ETO KC (0)
 Most goals scored – Győri Audi ETO KC (443)
 Fewest goals scored – Budapest Bank-Békéscsabai Előre NKSE (287)
 Most goals conceded – Dunaújvárosi NKS (370)
 Fewest goals conceded – Győri Audi ETO KC (251)

Away
 Most wins – Győri Audi ETO KC (11)
 Fewest wins – UKSE Szekszárd and Kiskunhalas NKSE (1)
 Most losses – Alcoa FKC-RightPhone, DVSC-Fórum, Dunaújvárosi NKS and UKSE Szekszárd (9)
 Fewest losses – Győri Audi ETO KC (0)
 Most goals scored – Győri Audi ETO KC (445)
 Fewest goals scored – Alcoa FKC-RightPhone (280)
 Most goals conceded – Kiskunhalas NKSE (377)
 Fewest goals conceded – Győri Audi ETO KC (279)

Scoring
 Widest winning margin: 28 goals –
Győri Audi ETO KC 46–18 DVSC-Fórum (15 February 2012)
 Most goals in a match: 82 goals –
FTC-Rail Cargo Hungaria 45–37 Kiskunhalas NKSE (1 February 2012)
 Fewest goals in a match: 45 goals –
Budapest Ban-Békéscsabai Előre NKSE 23–22 UKSE Szekszárd (14 January 2012)
 Most goals scored by losing team: 38 goals –
Dunaújvárosi NKS 38–41 Budapest Bank-Békéscsabai Előre NKSE (19 January 2012)
 Most goals scored in a match by one player: 14 goals –
 Éva Barna for Kiskunhalas NKSE against Dunaújvárosi NKS (2 March 2012)
 Anita Bulath for Veszprém Barabás KC against UKSE Szekszárd (9 December 2011)
 Heidi Løke for Győri Audi ETO KC against FTC-Rail Cargo Hungaria (11 January 2012)

Postseason

Classification round 9–12
Teams finished in bottom four places after the regular season entered a classification round, in which a double round-robin system was use. According to their final position in the regular season, these four teams were awarded bonus points. Ninth placed Békéscsaba got four points, tenth placed Dunaújváros were awarded three, eleventh placed Kiskunhalas got two points and finally last placed Szekszárd received one point.

Results

Table

Additional points that were awarded after the final positions in the regular season are indicated in bonus points column.

Classification round 5–8
Teams finished between fifth and eight place also played a classification round. Similarly to the Classification round 9–12, these four teams were given bonus points depending on their position in the regular season.

Results

Table

Additional points that were awarded after the final positions in the regular season are indicated in the bonus points column.

Championship playoff
Once again, title holders Győri Audi ETO KC have finished the regular season without a single defeat. Ferencváros, the club of the IXth district of Budapest, finished just behind the defending champions. The two other semi-finalists, Siófok and Érd both played in the classification round 9-12 last season, but this year they reached the last table, and fought for their first medal in the elite championship and a spot in a European cup.

Bracket

Semi-finals

Győri Audi ETO KC vs. ÉTV-Érdi VSE

Győri Audi ETO KC won series 2–0

FTC-Rail Cargo Hungaria vs. Siófok KC-Galerius Fürdő

FTC-Rail Cargo Hungaria won series 2–0

Third place playoffs

Siófok KC-Galerius Fürdő won series 2–1

Finals

Győri Audi ETO KC won series 2–0

Final standing

See also
 List of Hungarian women's handball transfers summer 2011

References

External links
 Worldhandball – IT help
 Hungarian Handball Federation official website

Nemzeti Bajnokság I (women's handball)
2011–12 domestic handball leagues
Nemzeti Bajnoksag I Women
2011 in women's handball
2012 in women's handball